Vermandel is a surname. Notable people with the surname include:

Eva Vermandel (born 1974), Belgian photographer
René Vermandel (1893–1958), Belgian cyclist